Seven Provinces may refer to
Septem Provinciae, an ancient Roman province
Dutch Republic, the Seven United Provinces of the Netherlands
HNLMS De Zeven Provinciën, several Dutch ships